Mosheh Lichtenstein (born July 7, 1961) is a co-rosh yeshiva of Yeshivat Har Etzion located in Alon Shvut. He is the eldest son of Rabbi Aharon Lichtenstein and Dr. Tovah Soloveitchik.

Biography 
Mosheh Lichtenstein came on Aliyah with his family in 1971 from New York, when his father Rav Aharon Lichtenstein was offered the position of Rosh Yeshiva at Yeshivat Har Etzion. He studied at the Netiv Meir High School in Jerusalem, and thereafter, spent a year studying with his grandfather, Rabbi Joseph B. Soloveitchik, in America from 1979-1980. From 1980-1985, he did hesder at Yeshivat Har Etzion, serving in tanks in the Armored Corps. He received Semicha from the Rabbanut and a degree in English Literature from Hebrew University. Lichtenstein was hired as a Ram at Yeshivat Har Etzion in 1992. He went on sabbatical during the 1997 and 1998 academic years and served as Rosh Kollel of the Torat Tzion Kollel in Cleveland. He also taught at Bruria, an Advanced Program for Women in Jerusalem from 1992-1997. At present, he is responsible for the Yeshivat Har Etzion's Kollel Gavoha, teaches Shiur Hei at Yeshivat Har Etzion, teaches an Iyun Shiur on Zevachim and gives a weekly Shiur for Shana Bet. He also teaches at the Beit Midrash for Women Migdal Oz. On September 25, 2008 (Tishrei 5769), Rav Yehuda Amital officially announced his retirement, to take effect on the last day of the Jewish month of Tishrei, in the year 5769 (October 28, 2008). He also announced that Lichtenstein would assume the position as the fourth Rosh Yeshiva on that same day. Lichtenstein was inaugurated as Rosh Yeshiva alongside Rabbis Aharon Lichtenstein, Yaakov Medan and Baruch Gigi.

Personal 
Lichtenstein is married to Dr. Michal Lichtenstein. They reside in Alon Shevut, where the Yeshiva is located, and have three daughters.

Works
Moses - Envoy of God, Envoy of His People
"What" Hath Brisk Wrought: The Brisker Derekh Revisited The Torah U-Madda Journal, No. 9 (2000)
Kol Isha: A Women's Voice, Tradition Vol. 46, No. 1 (2013)
Netivei Nevuah - Mabat El Hahaftarot (2015)

Family Tree

References

External links
"What" Hath Brisk Wrought: The Brisker Derekh Revisited at YUTorah Online
 http://traditionarchive.org/news/article.cfm?id=105748
 J. Brull (2020), The Educational Thought of Rabbi Mosheh Lichtenstein as an Expansion of the Classic "Brisker Derekh" and its Application in Teaching Talmud in Yeshiva High Schools (Hebrew)  

Living people
1961 births
21st-century Israeli rabbis
Religious Zionist rosh yeshivas
Israeli Modern Orthodox rabbis
Yeshivat Har Etzion
Soloveitchik rabbinic dynasty
Israeli settlers
Israeli soldiers
Jewish military personnel
Israeli Orthodox rabbis